Anthony Arthur Barber, known as Tony Barber (born 3 December 1942) is an English-born author, singer-songwriter,inventor, artist, papercrafter and soft toy designer who emigrated to Australia in 1963.

Biography 
He was a member of the band Billy Thorpe & the Aztecs in the 1960s. Subsequently performing as a solo artist, his biggest hit was "Someday" (Aust #13/1966). He wrote 35 children's books in the 1980s under the names A. A. Barber and Tony Barber, including The Puggle Tales. He appeared on the children's television show The Music Shop as Tony the Toymaker. Many of his books feature a fantasy character he created and named "Puggle", for which he also designed a stuffed toy of the same name that gained popularity and that was then used to name a baby echidna.

Barber founded The Lost Forests chain of toy stores, which sold soft toys that he designed.

References

External links
 ARTristic Australian site
 ARTristic North American site

1942 births
Living people
English emigrants to Australia
Australian musicians
Australian children's writers
Billy Thorpe and the Aztecs members